Cinq Music Group is a technology driven, music distribution, record label, and rights management company. Cinq Music earned dozens of RIAA Gold & Platinum certifications, and received a nomination as Billboard Latin Urban Label of the Year. Cinq Music was started as a digital music distribution company in 2012 by Barry Daffurn. Cinq Music Group now provides rights management, content creation and label services for recording artists. Janet Jackson released her "Made For Now" music video in collaboration with Cinq in August 2018, the collaboration with Daddy Yankee, returned Jackson to the Billboard Hot 100 chart for the first time since 2015, and her 20th number one on the Dance Club Songs chart.

Focusing on independent and untapped talent, Percy Miller (aka Master P) became president of Urban Music Development at Cinq in 2017. Cinq received first round venture capital funding in 2015.

In September 2020, Cinq acquired the record label Beluga Heights Records, the home to Jason Derulo.

Clients 
Featured clients include:

 J Alvarez
 Arcángel
 Antonio Barullo
 Beluga Heights Records
 De La Ghetto
 Diamante Eléctrico
 Farruko
 Janet Jackson
 Jory
 Camila Luna
 Nengo Flow
 Plan B
Ñejo & Dalmata
 Justin Quiles
 Andy Rivera
 T.I.
 King98

Awards
In 2016, Cinq was a nominee and finalist for Billboard Magazine's, Latin Rhythm Albums Label of the Year, with Sony Music Latin winning the category.

|-
| 2016
| Latin Rhythm Albums Label of the Year
| Billboard Magazine
| 
| 
| 
|-
|2017
| Best Contemporary Pop Vocal Album
|Latin Grammy Award
| 
| Flora y Faῦna by Camila Luna
|

References

External links
Music on Twitter
Cinq Music on Facebook

2012 establishments in California
Companies based in Santa Monica, California
Record labels based in California